Brisbane Town Hall may refer to:
 Brisbane City Hall, the current building in Brisbane, Queensland, Australia
 First Brisbane Town Hall, the first town hall in Brisbane, Queensland, Australia (no longer extant)